The Victorian Head of the River regatta is contested between the eleven Associated Public Schools of Victoria (APS).

The Head of the River is the oldest continuous schoolboy rowing event in the world, dating back to 1868, and throughout its history has changed format on a number of occasions: from a duel-style race between Melbourne Grammar and Scotch College on the Yarra River in Melbourne, to the current regatta, with the race usually being the last of the official APS rowing season. The race has been rowed on Lake Nagambie since 2001, which is a full-buoyed international standard course allowing six-boat finals.

History
A Brief History
(The author acknowledges the many sources from which these comments arise. See below.)

The "Head of the River" is a classic event and is one of the premier events in Victorian rowing.

The first Public School boat race in Victoria was rowed downstream on the Upper Yarra on 18 June 1868. The race was the outcome of negotiations between two Melbourne University Boat Club members: J. H. Thompson, on behalf of Melbourne Grammar School, and J. C. Johnstone, a member of the Scotch College staff. Those gentlemen coached their respective crews. Crews had been rowing on the river for some time, but the challenge for the race issued by one of the Scotch College rowers was only made on 17 June. It was promptly accepted by Melbourne Grammar School and, even in those early days, the contest aroused substantial interest.

The challenge read as follows:

The result was a victory for Scotch College by a length. The names of the crews were as follows :

Scotch College. Bow: A. C. Wilson, 2: A. Smith, 3: John C. Field, Str: J. Brady, Cox: F. G. White, Cch: J Johnstone.

Melbourne Grammar School. Bow: J. Sweeney, 2: G. T. Teague, 3: W. Barker, Str: H. Ryan, Cox: H. M. Strachan, Cch: J H Thompson.

(J.C. Robinson, in a letter to The Argus on 15 May 1918, maintained that there had been an earlier race in 1859, but that claim was denied in The Argus of 18 May 1918, by J Henning Thompson, whom Robinson had named as being a member of the 1859 Melbourne Grammar crew.)

The race for "Head-of-the-River" has been rowed every year since 1868. Wesley College wanted to row against the other two schools in 1871 in the annual race. However, it was decided that, "as it was an old-established race, which it was a pity to disturb", Scotch College and the Grammar School should row against Wesley College in turn. The races were on 19 and 20 June 1871. Wesley College proved their mettle by beating the Scotch boys on the 20th, after being beaten in a hard race by Melbourne Grammar the previous afternoon. Wesley College boys soon took part regularly in the race with the other two, and were "Head-of-the-River" in 1874.

The races were rowed from 1868–1897 in string-test gigs with fixed seats. During the period 1898–1900, the race was competed for in best boat outrigger fours with sliding seats. From 1901, clinker outrigged eights with sliding seats were used. At various times later, cedar boats, followed by plywood boats, fiberglass and, finally, composite construction boats have been used.

In 1879, the race was first rowed on the Barwon River, and then in every fifth or sixth year until 1916. Between 1921–1943, the Barwon saw the contest every fourth year and, since 1948, the only use of the Yarra was in 1957 when Geelong College won. During World War II, the Geelong schools rowed a heat on the Barwon, while the four Melbourne Schools rowed heats on the Yarra. Those races were held after school, and the winners met on the Yarra to decide the title, except in 1943, when restrictions on travel were in force.

Scotch College has been represented every year. Gradually, other schools have joined the contest, with the most recent being Haileybury College, who entered the Boys First Eight event for the first time in 1991.

The Sumner Challenge Cup and the Fairbairn Challenge Cup are the two trophies connected with this great contest. The Sumner Challenge Cup was presented in 1875 by the Hon. T. J. Sumner, to become the property of the school which first won it three times. Scotch won it in 1875, 1876 and 1879, and have retained the cup since that date. At a meeting of delegates, held at Scotch College on 1 April 1911, it was unanimously decided to accept the Challenge Cup which was offered by Charles Fairbairn, of "Banongil", Skipton, to be held from year to year by the School which was Head of the River.

The Head of the River races have weathered such difficulties as flooded rivers, disputes over ages, dead heats, disqualifications, and even the inability of a school to round up enough rowers to boat a crew.

Before World War II, only the first crew of each school took part in the Head of the River Regatta, but there was a race for second crews and sometimes third crews raced on the Saturday prior to the Head of the River race.

In the early part of the 20th century the race was held in October, but later it was moved to May and, after World War II, to April. When the race was held in October, it was possible for a boy to represent his school in football, cricket, rowing and athletics in the one year, as the latter competition was held in May after the cricket season had ended.

Schoolgirl Participation at the Head of the River

The first girl to row within the A.P.S. was a lone sculler from Geelong Grammar School in 1972. There were 32 girls rowing by 1975, and in 1981, girls began competing at the Senior Regatta with Geelong Grammar School, The Geelong College, Melbourne Girls Grammar School, Morongo Girls' School and Lauriston Girls' School racing in 1st and 2nd Fours over 800m. Methodist Ladies' College and Carey Baptist Grammar School joined in 1982, with Carey boating a First Four in 1983.

1984 was the final year school girls from schools outside of the APS participated in the APS Head of the River, with seven girls' crews rowing in the 1st, 2nd and 3rd Four events. The following year saw the regatta revert to an all APS event, with only the girls who attended the co-educational schools within the APS allowed to compete. This had only Geelong Grammar and Geelong College boating a First Four. Carey reappeared in the First Fours in 1986, the same year that Wesley College joined, and with Caulfield joining in 1987, all five co-educational schools were boating a first four over 1500m. Around this time, the Principal of the now-defunct Morongo Girls' School initiated a meeting that established the Head of School Girls' Regatta (HOSG). This regatta allowed any school with girls to put forward schoolgirl (exclusive) crews. This meant that all secondary schools that taught girls in Victoria had the chance to enter a competitive event, since they were now not able to compete at the APS Head of the River (unless they attended one of the co-educational APS Schools). The co-educational schools in the APS were still (and continue to be) allowed to enter boats at the Head of the Schoolgirls Regatta. 

For the male students of the APS Schools in Victoria, the Head of the River regatta is their main Victorian regatta, whereas female students of the APS Schools of Victoria split their focus between the Head of the Schoolgirls Regatta and the Head of the River Regatta. However, the Head of the Schoolgirls Regatta is the pinnacle for Schoolgirl Rowing in Victoria as it features a larger range of competitors including non-APS Schools such as Firbank Grammar School, Genazzano FCJ College, Loreto Toorak, Melbourne Girls' Grammar School, Methodist Ladies College and St Catherine's School. While Geelong Grammar School has often shown strong results at both regattas, on average the Schoolgirl Senior Eight divisions at the Head of the Schoolgirls Regatta tend to be dominated by non-APS schools. It is interesting to note that Senior crews at the Head of the Schoolgirls Regatta compete over 1500m (limited by the length of the Barwon River in Geelong), compared to 2000m at the Head of the River Regatta.

Haileybury College began admitting girls in 2007 (who began rowing in the same year) resulting in the Head of the River for girls being contested by six of the eleven APS Schools.

Results

Head of the River (Boys) 
The 1st VIII is also known as the "Fairbairn Cup". This race is the actual "Head of the River" for the boys.

Head of the River (Girls) 
The 1st VIII is also known as the "Summer Cup". This race is the actual "Head of the River" for the girls.

See also
Head of the Schoolgirls (Victoria)
Head of the River (Australia)
Associated Public Schools of Victoria
Girls Sport Victoria (GSV)

References

External links 
Rowing Australia 
Rowing Victoria

Rowing competitions in Australia
Girls Sport Victoria
Associated Public Schools of Victoria
Recurring sporting events established in 1868